Last For One is a b-boy crew that formed in 1997. With their win in the 2005 Battle of the Year, they have been recognized as a worldwide known name and a contributor to the Korean Wave, their fans respectively calling them the 'Dancing Taeguk Warriors'. They were heavily featured in the film Planet B-Boy, which documents the 2005 Battle of the Year. While most of the members were poor and some lived in extreme poverty in the Southern part of South Korea they had traveled to the capital of Seoul to compete in Battle of the Year otherwise known as BOTY. B-boy Joe currently heads the main wing while B-boy (Jusung) Lee and B-girl (Zaina Freeman) Zinny are regional members and compete in U.S. or international based events.

Members
B-boy Beat Joe (Cho Sung Gook) (1983)
"Until the day street dancing is recognized as a true art, I want to be a person that spreads the word."

B-boy Taiyou (Suh Ju Hyun) (1983)
"I always remember and cherish the moment of the win in Infinity Battle Master."

B-boy Style-m (Lee Yong Joo) (1983)
"The final win is not the leap you took from the starting point. It is all the effort and patience it took to reach it."

B-boy Fresh (Park Kyung Hoon) (1983)
"I want to be a person that always smiles and becomes a source of strength for someone."

B-boy Min (Jun Hyo Min) (1985)
"I wish people of the whole world would know what b-boying is."

B-boy Stone (Choi Min Suk) (1984)
B-boy Baebaeng (Bae Byung Yup) (1985)
"I don't want to dance to make money, I wanna make money to dance."

B-boy Zero-Nine (Shin Young Suk) (1985)
"I want to be able to make people be happy with one body movement."

B-boy Finger (Yoo Dae Hyuk) (1986)
B-boy Ssack (Kim Jin Ook)
"Instead of the best b-boy, I want to be a b-boy that anyone can remember."

Popping Woogu (Lee Woo Jin) (1983)
"I want to communicate with people and express myself through my dance movements"

New Generation
B-boy T.K.O(Last For One/R&F)
B-boy Style Top(Last For One/Sof Thumbz)
B-boy Super B(Last For One/Soul Hunters)
B-boy Ghost(Last For One/Funky Steam)
B-boy Sleepwalker(Last For One/Soul Hunters)
B-boy Lee(Last For One USA/Giga Drill)
B-boy Leety(Last For One/R&F)
B-girl Zinny(Last For One/Krazy Bratz)
B-boy T(Last For One/Ground Scratch)
B-boy Ssin(Last For One/Feel the force)
B-boy Lip(Last For One)
B-boy Gaspar (last for one)
B-boy Super B (Last For One)

History and awards
1998 - Seoul Maroni Performance Battle Competition 1st Place
1998 - National Dance Competition 2nd Place
1999 - Junju Dance Competition 1st Place (Three consecutive wins from 1999–2001)
2000 - Junju Battle Competition 1st Place
2001 - Seoul Hip Hop Festival 1st Place
2001 - jTV Dance Dance Program 3 Wins
2001 - Snickers CF
2001 - Junju Street Dance Party 2:2 1st Place
2002 - Junju Dance Festival Grand Award
2002 - Chungju 3:3 B-boy Battle 1st Place
2002 - Chunnam Dance Battle 1st Place
2002 - Seoul Streetmaster Championship - Performance 1st place, Battle 2nd place
2002 - Seoul Underground B-boy Master 1st Place
2002 - Chunnam Dance Festival 1st Place
2003 - Seoul Street Jam Vol. 2 Top of the Top 1st Place
2003 - Seoul B-boy Unit Vol. 5 3rd Place
2003 - Daejun 2:2 B-boy Dance Battle 1st Place
2003 - Nambu representative of Seoul High Festival
2003 - Seoul Infinity Battle Master Competition 1st Place
2003 - Chunnam Kwangju 3:3 B-boy Battle Competition 1st Place
2003 - Seoul Battle of the Year Korea 03 Semifinals
2003 - Seoul Levi's Battle Master 1st Place
2003 - Osaka, Japan Battle of Hirapa 1st Place
2004 - Levi's Endorsement Performance
2004 - Seoul B-boy Party 2:2 Battle Semifinals
2004 - Seoul B-boy Challenge Vol. 4 Semifinals
2004 - Fukuoka, Japan B-boy Break Title Solo Battle Vol. 6 1st Place
2004 - Seoul's 2nd Levi's B-boy Master 1st Place
2004 - MTV CF Endorsement
2004 - Chinese College Hip Hop Competition JUDGE
2005 - Seoul Match One's Skill 1:1 Battle Showcase
2005 - Spain 3:3 B-boy Battle Competition JUDGE
2005 - "Spain Underground Republic 3" Europe B-boy Battle 3:3 1st Place
2005 - Battle of the Year Korea 1st Place
2005 - Battle of the Year WIN
2005 - Chocoba CF
2005 - e. Comfortable Life CF
2006 - Battle of the Year 2nd Place

See also
 List of dancers

External links
 Last For One Official Site

 Performance videos
 
 
 
 
 

South Korean breakdancing groups